Philip, also Philip of Courtenay (1243 – 15 December 1283), held the title of Latin Emperor of Constantinople from 1273–1283, although Constantinople had been reinstated since 1261 AD to the Byzantine Empire; he lived in exile and only held authority over Crusader States in Greece. He was born in Constantinople, the son of Baldwin II of Constantinople and Marie of Brienne. 

In his youth, his father was forced to mortgage him to Venetian merchants to raise money for the support of his empire, which was lost to the Empire of Nicaea in 1261.

By the Treaty of Viterbo in 1267, his father agreed to marry him to Beatrice of Sicily, daughter of Charles I of Sicily and Beatrice of Provence.

The marriage was performed in October 1273 at Foggia; shortly thereafter, Baldwin died, and Philip inherited his claims on Constantinople. Although Philip was recognized as emperor by the Latin possessions in Greece, much of the actual authority devolved on the Angevin kings of Naples and Sicily.  Philip died in Viterbo in 1283. 

Philip and Beatrice had a daughter: 
Catherine (25 November 1274 – 11 October 1307, Paris), married Charles, Count of Valois in 1301.

Ancestry

References

References

1243 births
1283 deaths
13th-century Latin Emperors of Constantinople
Christians of the Crusades
Philip